USS LST-461 was a United States Navy  used in the Asiatic-Pacific Theater during World War II. As with many of her class, the ship was never named. Instead, she was referred to by her hull designation.

Construction
The ship was laid down on 30 September 1942, under Maritime Commission (MARCOM) contract, MC hull 981, by  Kaiser Shipyards, Vancouver, Washington; launched 3 November 1942; sponsored by Mrs. Eugene E. Blazier; and commissioned on 18 February 1943.

Service history
During World War II, LST-461 was assigned to the Asiatic-Pacific theater. She took part in the capture and occupation of Saipan in June and July 1944; in the capture and occupation of Tinian in July 1944; the Leyte operation in October 1944; the Lingayen Gulf landings in January 1945; in the Nasugbu operations in January 1945; and the assault and occupation of Okinawa Gunto in May 1945.

Following the war, LST-461 returned to the United States and was decommissioned on 2 September 1947, and struck from the Navy list on 16 September, that same year. On 30 March 1948, the tank landing ship was sold to Consolidated Builders, Inc., of Seattle, Washington, and subsequently scrapped.

Honors and awards
LST-461 earned six battle stars for her World War II service.

Notes 

Citations

Bibliography 

Online resources

External links

 

1942 ships
World War II amphibious warfare vessels of the United States
LST-1-class tank landing ships of the United States Navy
S3-M2-K2 ships
Ships built in Vancouver, Washington
Ships of the Aleutian Islands campaign